Matt Pagnutti (born September 25, 1975) is a Canadian retired professional ice hockey defenceman who, over eight seasons, played 555 regular season games and 86 playoff games in the ECHL .

Matt's father, Rick Pagnutti, also played professional hockey.

Career statistics

Awards and honors

References

External links

1975 births
Arkansas RiverBlades players
Barrie Colts (OHA junior A) players
Canadian ice hockey defencemen
Carolina Monarchs players
Clarkson Golden Knights men's ice hockey players
Florida Everblades players
Ice hockey people from Ontario
Living people
Louisiana IceGators (ECHL) players
Milwaukee Admirals players
Sportspeople from Greater Sudbury
AHCA Division I men's ice hockey All-Americans